Louis Claude Noisette (2 November 1772 at Chatillon – 9 January 1849) was a French botanist and horticulturist, son of Joseph Noisette, gardener to the Count of Provence, the future Louis XVIII.

In 1795, after a short stint in the infantry, he became a gardener at Val-de-Grace but his position was eliminated around 1798. For several years, he accumulated funds to found, in 1806, along with his brothers, a botanical facility to collect plants. He had a rich collection of roses.

For him, Claude Antoine Thory (1759–1827) named Rosa x noisettiana or the Noisette Rose, the hybrid obtained by Noisette from seeds sent by his brother, Philippe Noisette, who had received a government mission in America, and had settled in South Carolina. Phillipe Noisette gave the planter John Champneys a plant of Rosa x 'Old Blush' sent by Louis Claude from France. This one was fertilized by Rosa moschata (the Musk Rose) which resulted in Rosa x 'Champneys's Pink Cluster'. It was from the sowing of seeds of 'Champney's Pink Cluster' sent by Phillipe, that Louis Noisette obtained Rosa x 'Blush Noisette', the first Noisette rose.

Louis Claude Noisette became famous all over Europe. In Austria, Prince Nicolas II Esterházy called on him to plant his vast estate.

Noisette was responsible for the introduction and the distribution in France of a large number of rare American and Indian plants. For these reasons, he was named a Chevalier of the Legion of Honor on May 8, 1840.

Noisettia is a genus of small flowering plants, native to tropical America in the family Violaceae, named after him.

He died in 1849 without children. His two brothers, also gardeners, and who left descendants were Philippe (born in 1773 in Paris and died in 1835 in Charleston, South Carolina) and Antoine (born in Torcy in 1778 and died in Nantes in 1858). The latter directed the botanical garden in Nantes. The descendants of Phillipe Noisette operated a nursery in the Charleston, South Carolina area into the 1940s.

In the Garden of the King at the Palace of Versailles, one of the gardens is named in honor of "Louis Noisette - great gardener".

1772 births
1849 deaths
Chevaliers of the Légion d'honneur
19th-century French botanists
French horticulturists
Rose breeders
18th-century French botanists